Storm is a 2003 album released by Israeli psychedelic trance DJ duo Skazi.

Track listing

"Super Skazi"
"Storm"
"Let's Go To Mars"
"Passion"
"Element"
"Alive"
"War"
"Tuning"
"GTR"

2003 albums
Skazi albums